Robert Brown Bennie (28 September 1873 – 1 October 1945) was a Scottish footballer who played in the Football League for Newcastle United. He came into consideration for an international cap in 1902, taking part in the Home Scots v Anglo-Scots trial, but this did not lead on to selection for Scotland.

He was a member of a footballing family: older brother Peter (a teammate at St Mirren) and younger brother John had short careers in Scotland, nephew Peter played for Burnley in the 1920s and nephew Bob played for Scotland in the same period.

References

1873 births
1945 deaths
Scottish footballers
Scottish Football League players
English Football League players
Association football defenders
Airdrieonians F.C. (1878) players
Royal Albert F.C. players
Heart of Midlothian F.C. players
St Mirren F.C. players
Newcastle United F.C. players
Footballers from Falkirk (council area)
People from Polmont